The Neighbor is a 1993 horror thriller film directed by Rodney Gibbons, starring Rod Steiger, Linda Kozlowski and Ron Lea.

Plot
The film is about an aging gynecologist (Rod Steiger) with a "killer instinct" who terrorizes his urban neighbors (Linda Kozlowski and Ron Lea) in a rural community in Burlington, Vermont.

Cast
 Rod Steiger as Dr. Myron Hatch
Benjamin Shirinian as Young Myron Hatch
 Linda Kozlowski as Mary / Mrs. Hatch
 Ron Lea as John
 Bruce Boa as Bishop
 Jane Wheeler as Dr. Wayburn
 Sean McCann as Lieutenant Crow
 Frances Bay as Aunt Sylvia
 Harry Standjofski as Morrie
 Pauline Little as Rebecca
 Mark Camacho as Bank Manager
 Claire Riley as Dr. Statner
 Linda Singer as Clinic Receptionist
 Philip Spensley as The Pharmacist
 Gordon Masten as City Worker

Production
While filming, Steiger commented on his character: "He¨s a person whose acts are villainous and sad, a sick person. Otherwise, I couldn't play him. I don't know how you do a villain. But I can understand a person having the psychosis". Opining that contemporary films were "all too violent for no reason", he iterated that The Neighbor was a thriller, "not a bloodbath".

Reception
The film was not well received by critics. Dennis Schwartz considered it to have been one of Steiger's creepiest roles, believing that the poor script had rendered the role awkward and "mildly entertaining in the sense that Steiger is asked to carry the film and hams it up". "Despite slick production values and some clever Hitchcockian touches, there is little to distinguish The Neighbor from formulaic made-for-TV fare", writes Cavett Binion for Allmovie, giving 3 of 5 stars. Rod Steiger's performance has been described as "decent", though the movie is "extremely predictable". In the Canadian press, the film was described as "an unpleasant Canadian effort" which for "some obscure reason ... made a brief pit stop in theatres last month before heading for video".

References

External links
 
 

1993 films
1990s horror thriller films
1993 horror films
American horror thriller films
Films set in Vermont
Films directed by Rodney Gibbons
1990s English-language films
1990s American films